Alan Permane is a British Formula One engineer. He is currently the sporting director at the Alpine Formula One team.

Career

Permane started his career in motorsport in 1989 as a test electronics engineer for the Benetton F1 team. He was promoted to a junior race engineer in 1996 and then subsequently became a race engineer from 1997 to 2006 for the Enstone outfit as the team became Renault F1, engineering drivers such as Jarno Trulli and Giancarlo Fisichella. In 2007 he became the chief race engineer for Renault F1 and in 2011 the Chief Operating Officer. In 2012 Permane became the Sporting Director for the team now called Lotus F1 a position he still retains to this day as the team transitioned back into Renault F1 and then into Alpine F1 Team.

References

1967 births
Living people
Formula One engineers
21st-century British engineers
Benetton Formula
Renault people